The Gull Terrier (also known as the Gull Terr) is a rare breed of dog that originates from the Punjab region of Pakistan and India; it is believed to be several hundred years old. They are often used in dog fighting, hunting, and guarding. The Gull Terrier is related to the Bull Terrier breeds that come from Great Britain. These English dog breeds, along with those indigenous to the Indian subcontinent such as the Bully Kutta, played a major role in the Gull Terrier's breeding development and are considered to be a direct ancestor of the modern Gull Terrier.

Description
A Gull Terrier is a tall, broad chested, medium-sized molosser dog that is mostly found in Pakistan and India. Gull Terriers have large erect ears. Their coats are normally white, although sometimes they have dark-colored markings on their faces and bodies.

Gull Terriers are wary of strangers. They are protective of their owners and territory. They are highly trainable.

Origin
During the era of the British Raj in India, Bull Terriers were introduced to the northwestern Indian subcontinent, which now includes the modern republics of India and Pakistan. In colonial India, the Bull Terrier breed soared in popularity, with the Bull Terrier Club of India being established in Calcutta. Bull Terriers were crossed with local breeds to develop the Gull Terrier, often called the Indian Bull Terrier and also now the Indian Bull Terrier. The Gull Terrier is a medium-sized dog with short, smooth fur which resembles that of the Staffordshire Bull Terrier. These dogs were originally used in blood sports such as bull baiting, and dog fighting - a bloody entertainment introduced by the British to the Indian subcontinent. When the blood sport was made illegal across the Empire, the Gull Terriers were used as guard dogs. In colonial India, some breeders crossed the Gull Terrier with the Bully Kutta, naming the progeny the "Gull Dong", which "is celebrated in India and Pakistan for its speed and tenacity".

Health 
The Gull Terrier is prone to deafness and blindness, but aside from that, there are no common medical problems affecting these dogs.

Ban

Under the New York City Housing Authority, Gull Terriers, alongside Gull Dongs, are banned in homes. The dog is also banned in the Cayman Islands.

See also
 Dogs portal
 List of dog breeds
 List of dog breeds from India

References

Notes

Citations

External links
The Gull Terr

Dog breeds originating in India
Dog breeds originating in Pakistan
Dog fighting breeds
Rare dog breeds